Ruthenian sobor, or Ruthenian Congress was a Polonophile Political Committee, based in Lviv and created on May 23, 1848 by Polish nobleman of Ukrainian origin "in the name of supporting harmony and unity in peace Motherland". Ruthenian sobor had 64 members strongly opposed the Polish-Ukrainian administrative partition of Galicia (Eastern and Western Galicia) and collaborated with the Polish People's Council. Ruthenian sobor was opposite of the Supreme Ruthenian Council. It operated during the Spring of Nations time, and was dissolved with the reestablishment of the government control by fall that year.

Its leaders was Leon Sapieha, A., J., and Włodzimierz Dzieduszycki, and J. and L. Jabłonowski.

External links 
 Ruthenian Congress in the Encyclopedia of Ukraine, vol. 3 (1993)
 Supreme Ruthenian Council in the Encyclopedia of Ukraine, vol. 3 (1993)

References 

History of Lviv
1848 establishments in Europe
1848 disestablishments in Europe
History of Ruthenia